Corey Alexander Fuller (born June 23, 1990) is a former American football wide receiver. He is currently a College Scout for the Carolina Panthers of the National Football League (NFL). He played college football at Virginia Tech and was drafted by the Detroit Lions in the sixth round of the 2013 NFL Draft. He was also a member of the New Orleans Saints.

High school career
Fuller attended Woodlawn High School in Baltimore, Maryland. He lettered two seasons in football as a quarterback, and was a Nike indoor track All-American as a senior. He won first-team all-state indoor and outdoor track honors as a senior, and was an AAU National Champion as a member of the Baltimore City AAU team his final season.

College career

Track and field
Fuller enrolled at the University of Kansas in 2008 on a track and field scholarship.

Fuller competed in the 100 meters, triple jump and long jump in his two years at Kansas. He had a very successful freshman season, finishing second in the triple jump at both the Kansas and Drake Relays. He also placed in the top three in six of the eight indoor meets in which he competed in 2009, and had the team’s top triple jump in the outdoor season as a sophomore and third-best 100-meter time.

Personal bests

Football
Fuller decided to transfer to Virginia Tech in fall 2010 where his brother Vincent Fuller had played and his younger brother Kyle Fuller was a current player, and walked-on to the football team, while sitting out the 2010 season. After recording only two receptions for 19 yards in 2011, Fuller became a full-time starter in his final season. He played in all 13 games, making eight starts, and recorded 43 receptions for 815 yards and six touchdowns.

Professional playing career

Detroit Lions
Fuller was drafted by the Detroit Lions in the sixth round, 171st overall in the 2013 NFL Draft. He  was cut by the Lions on August 31, 2013, but was assigned to the practice roster the next day. He spent the entire 2013 season on the practice squad.

On August 30, 2014, Corey made the Lions 53-man roster. On September 8, 2014, Fuller made his NFL debut, playing 15 snaps. Fuller was active in Week 1 ahead of Kevin Ogletree and Ryan Broyles. On October 19 against the New Orleans Saints, Fuller scored his first NFL touchdown, making a leaping grab of a 5-yard pass from Matthew Stafford. The touchdown proved to be the game-winner in a 24–23 comeback win for Detroit.

Fuller had offseason foot surgery in June 2016 and was placed on the PUP list to start the season. He was activated off the PUP list on November 8, 2016 prior to Week 10. He was released by the Lions on November 22, 2016 and was signed to the practice squad the next day.

New Orleans Saints
On December 19, 2016, Fuller was signed by the New Orleans Saints off the Lions' practice squad. He was placed on injured reserve on September 2, 2017. He was released by the Saints on November 6, 2017.

Post-playing career
Following his NFL career, he served as a graduate assistant coach with the Central Michigan Chippewas in 2018.

Fuller returned to his alma mater in July 2020 after Virginia Tech announced he was hired as an assistant director of player personnel.

In June 2021, the Carolina Panthers announced that Fuller was hired as a scouting assistant. In June 2022, the Panthers promoted him to their West Coast area scout.

Personal life
Fuller's brothers all also played college football at Virginia Tech. His older brother, Vincent, is a retired NFL safety who spent the majority of his career with the Tennessee Titans. His younger brother, Kyle, is a cornerback, who was selected by the Chicago Bears in the first round of the 2014 NFL Draft. His youngest brother, Kendall, is also a cornerback who was selected by the Washington Redskins in the third round of the 2016 NFL Draft.

References

External links
Virginia Tech Hokies staff bio

1990 births
American football wide receivers
Virginia Tech Hokies football players
Living people
Players of American football from Baltimore
Detroit Lions players
New Orleans Saints players